Astrothelium flavomurisporum is a species of corticolous (bark-dwelling), crustose lichen in the family Trypetheliaceae. Found in Brazil, it was formally described as a new species in 2016 by lichenologists André Aptroot and Marcela Cáceres. The ascomata are pear-shaped (pyriform), measuring 0.5–0.7 mm in diameter, and typically aggregate in groups of two to five, usually quite immersed in the bark tissue. Ascospores are hyaline, ellipsoid, and muriform (divided into many compartment by both longitudinal and transverse septa); they measure 165–200 by 28–35 μm and have a thickened central septum. The presence of the lichen does not induce the formation of galls in the host. Thin-layer chromatography did not reveal the presence of any lichen products in the collected lichen samples. The characteristics that distinguish Astrothelium flavomurisporum from other members of Astrothelium include the dispersed groups of fused, immersed (barely visible) ascomata; and the median thickening of the ascospores.

References

flavomurisporum
Lichen species
Lichens described in 2016
Taxa named by André Aptroot
Taxa named by Marcela Cáceres
Lichens of North Brazil